Dating #NoFilter is an American dating reality television series that premiered on E! on January 21, 2019.

Background 
The show was produced by Lime Pictures and All3Media America. The series features a panel of comedians watching and making humorous commentary on footage of blind first dates set up by the producers.

The show was renewed for a second season on May 3, 2019. The second season premiered on August 6, 2019. A UK version of the series was ordered by Sky in December 2020. It premiered on February 25, 2021.

Format 
For every episode, singles are paired up and sent on blind first dates. A panel of seven comedians split into three pairs watches footage of the first dates and makes commentary while sitting on a couch and enjoying refreshments. Past panelists have included Nina Parker, Cara Connors, and Kelsey Darragh.

Reviews 
The Daily Telegraph rated it a 2 Star out of 5. It stated : "...the concept: those on the dates are there to be laughed at, by the comedians, by us, therefore they have to be risible – buffoons, braggarts and Barbie dolls. We cannot root for the singletons, as we do so often on First Dates, which robs the show of heart and purpose."

The Chortle rated it a 3 Star out of 5.

Sportsology called it "Dating on Steroids" and also "The hosts are funny, and the daters have no boundaries."

Cast

Main 

 Nina Parker as herself (host)
 Daisy May Cooper as herself (host for the British Version of Dating #NoFilter)
 Zach Noe Towers as himself (host)
 Biniam Bizuneh as himself (host)
 Ben Evans as himself (host)
 Cara Connors as herself (host)
 Kelsey Darragh as herself (host)
 Monroe Martin as himself (host)
 Shapel Lacey as himself (host)
 Steve Furey as himself (host)
 Rocky Dale Davis as himself (host)

Guest Stars 

 Dan Babic as himself
 Marco DelVecchio as himself
 Lexi Noel as herself
 Tyrone Evans Clark as himself
 Brian Mychal Fleming as himself / Breyoncé 
 Reante Brown as himself

See also 
 NoFilter

References 

2019 American television series debuts
English-language television shows
E! original programming
2010s American reality television series
2020s American reality television series
Dating and relationship reality television series
2020s British reality television series